A list of films produced by the Marathi language film industry based in Maharashtra in the year 1996.

1996 Releases
A list of Marathi films released in 1996.

References

Lists of 1996 films by country or language
 Marathi
1996